William Edward Carr (7 March 1905 – 1989) was a professional footballer who played in the Football League for Huddersfield Town and Southend United. Born in Framwellgate Moor, County Durham, Carr played in either wing-half position.

References

1905 births
1989 deaths
Footballers from County Durham
English footballers
Association football wing halves
Huddersfield Town A.F.C. players
Southend United F.C. players
English Football League players